The Southern Conference Educational Fund (SCEF) (1942-1981) was an organization that sought to promote social justice, civil rights, and electoral reform in the American South, particularly for African Americans. The organization began as the Education Fund of the Southern Conference for Human Welfare (SCHW), before becoming an independent successor organization after the SCHW was disbanded in 1948.

History
During 1948, the SCHW split over its support for presidential candidate:  some members supported Progressive Party candidate Henry A. Wallace, others the Democratic Party's incumbent US President Harry S. Truman. SCHW officers met in November 1948 and voted to end the floundering organization.  On November 20, 1948, SCHW leaders met at Monticello, Virginia, and passed a resolution to reformulate the organizations's last remaining group, the Southern Conference Educational Fund (SCEF), "committed solely to the ending of segregation in the south." The next day, November 21, 1948, SCHW leaders voted to disband.

In 1969, while serving as a staff member of SCEF, the civil rights activist and feminist Dorothy Zellner wrote a memo critiquing feminist consciousness-raising groups as "therapy" and for being insufficiently "political". In response, fellow SCEF member Carol Hanisch addressed an essay to the women's caucus of the SCEF in February 1969. Originally titled "Some Thoughts in Response to Dottie's Thoughts on a Women's Liberation Movement", the article was republished in 1970 in the book Notes from the Second Year: Women's Liberation under the title "The Personal is Political". The essay has since become widely circulated in feminist circles.

Due to financial problems, the organization disbanded in 1981.

Works
  Southern Patriot (SCEF newspaper)

See also
Anne Braden
Carl Braden
Carol Hanisch
Bob Zellner
Dorothy Zellner
New York Radical Women
The personal is political

References

1942 establishments in the United States
1948 establishments in the United States
1981 disestablishments in the United States
African Americans' rights organizations
Civil rights organizations in the United States
Left-wing politics in the United States
Liberalism in the United States
Organizations based in Atlanta
Organizations based in Louisville, Kentucky
Organizations based in New Orleans
Organizations established in 1942
Political advocacy groups in the United States
Progressivism in the United States
 
Suffrage organisations in the United States